Lukini is a small settlement in the City Municipality of Koper in the Littoral region of Slovenia close to the Croatian border.

References

External links

Lukini on Geopedia

Populated places in the City Municipality of Koper